Egesina javana is a species of beetle in the family Cerambycidae. It was described by Warren Samuel Fisher in 1934.

References

Egesina
Beetles described in 1934